WWE SmackDown, also known as Friday Night SmackDown or simply SmackDown, is an American professional wrestling television program produced by WWE that as of  currently airs live every Friday at 8 p.m. ET on Fox. Fox Deportes simulcasts the program with Spanish-language commentary. The show features characters from the SmackDown brand, to which WWE employees are assigned to work and perform.

SmackDown! debuted in the United States on UPN on April 29, 1999 and was formerly broadcast on Thursday nights. The show moved to Friday nights on September 9, 2005, and began airing on The CW in September 2006, after the merger of UPN and the WB. The show later moved to MyNetworkTV in October 2008. On October 1, 2010, SmackDown moved to cable network Syfy, and eventually returned to Thursdays on January 15, 2015. The show then moved to the sibling USA Network on January 7, 2016, and later that year, beginning on July 19, 2016, SmackDown began broadcasting live on Tuesday nights. SmackDowns move to Fox on October 4, 2019 marked the show's return to Friday nights and over-the-air broadcast television (as well as the second time SmackDown has aired on a Fox-owned network).

SmackDown has been broadcast from 163 arenas, 148 cities and towns, six countries: United States, Canada, United Kingdom, Japan in 2005, Italy in 2007, and Mexico in 2011. Prior to switching to its current live format, taped episodes premiered a few hours earlier in Ireland and the United Kingdom than in the United States (and a day earlier in Australia, Canada, Singapore, and the Philippines) due to time differences. For international broadcast listings, see below. The show celebrated its 15th anniversary on October 10, 2014, and the 1000th episode on October 16, 2018.

The WWE Network ceased operations in the United States on April 4, 2021, with all content moved to Peacock which now has all episodes of SmackDown. Recent episodes are still available for on-demand viewing 30 days after the original air date.

History

Early years (1999–2010)

WWF SmackDown! was set up to compete against World Championship Wrestling (WCW)'s Thursday night show, Thunder. SmackDown! first appeared on April 29, 1999 using the Raw set as a single television special on UPN. On August 26, 1999, SmackDown! officially debuted on UPN. Like Thunder, SmackDown! was recorded on Tuesdays and then broadcast on Thursdays. The new WWF show was so popular that WCW moved Thunder to Wednesdays so that it would not compete directly. Throughout the show's early existence, The Rock routinely called SmackDown! "his show", in reference to the fact that the name was derived from one of his catchphrases, "Layeth the Smack down". In March 2002, WWF implemented the "brand extension", under which Raw and SmackDown! would have separate rosters of performers that are exclusive to their respective programs and events, and be positioned in-universe as competing "brands" (in a manner reminiscent of athletic conferences).

In the 2004–05 season, SmackDown! had an average viewership of 5.1 million viewers, making it UPN's second-highest-rated series behind America's Next Top Model. With the cancellation of Star Trek: Enterprise, SmackDown! moved into its former timeslot on Friday nights for the 2005–06 season, beginning September 9, 2005. WWE subsequently announced that the show would be renamed Friday Night SmackDown! to emphasize the new scheduling.

In January 2006, CBS Corporation and Warner Bros. Entertainment announced that UPN and The WB would merge to form a new network known as The CW that fall. As part of the announcement, The CW announced that it would renew Friday Night SmackDown! for two more seasons as part of its launch schedule—which drew from the strongest programs of its two predecessors. On September 22, 2006, Friday Night SmackDown! aired its first episode on The CW.

The CW declined to renew SmackDown, resulting in the series being picked up in October 2008 by MyNetworkTV, a second new network that had been formed by Fox Entertainment Group to take on former UPN and WB affiliates who were not selected to join The CW. Retaining its previous Friday-night time slot, the season premiere of SmackDown on MyNetworkTV was the highest-rated program in the fledgling network's history, with 3.2 million viewers. On March 20, 2009, SmackDown celebrated its 500th episode.

Shifting to cable only (2010–2019)  
On October 1, 2010, as part of a new broadcast deal with NBC Universal, SmackDown moved to Syfy, retaining its Friday night timeslot. Prior to this premiere of SmackDown, Michael Cole hosted a "pre-game" show. The move saw Syfy paying close to $30 million for the show as opposed to the $20 million paid by its former network MyNetworkTV.

During the August 29, 2011 episode of Raw, WWE dissolved the brand extension, thus allowing performers to appear on Raw and SmackDown at any given time without restriction. The October 14, 2011, episode made SmackDown the second-longest-running weekly episodic television series of American television history (behind Raw, which surpassed that mark on August 1, 2005). On January 18, 2013, SmackDown celebrated its 700th episode.

On October 10, 2014, SmackDown celebrated its 15-year anniversary. To help celebrate the 15th anniversary, Stephanie McMahon came out first, then Laurinaitis and Long, respectively, the latter of which kept one-upping each other for the main event of the night until McMahon decided to keep the 15-man tag team match that Long suggested, on the condition Laurinaitis and Long be the captains of each team like at WrestleMania XXVIII. Long's team won the match. On December 16, 2014, SmackDown aired a live 800th episode special on Syfy's sister channel USA Network, SuperSmackDown Live!, featuring a main event between Dolph Ziggler and Seth Rollins.

In January 2015, SmackDown returned to a Thursday time slot. The return to Thursday nights was expected to help attract a younger audience to Syfy, as well as more premium advertising dollars from marketers, who tend to spend more to promote their products, especially film releases, on the night as consumers head into the weekend. The last SmackDown airing on a Friday night had 2.43 million viewers with a 0.7 share. On January 7, 2016, SmackDown moved to USA Network, remaining on Thursday nights. With the move, all top three WWE programs—Raw, SmackDown and Tough Enough—would air on the same network for the first time ever.

On May 25, 2016, as part of the re-implementation of the brand extension and split between Raw and SmackDown, it was announced that SmackDown would move to Tuesday nights and be broadcast live. On the July 11, 2016 episode of Raw, Vince McMahon named Shane McMahon the commissioner of SmackDown. Then next week on Raw, Daniel Bryan was revealed as the new SmackDown General Manager. On July 22, 2016, General Manager Daniel Bryan revealed the new SmackDown logo on his official Twitter page, renaming the show SmackDown Live. On April 10, 2018, SmackDown Commissioner Shane McMahon announced that Daniel Bryan was back as a full-time WWE wrestler and named Paige the new General Manager.

Return to broadcast television and Fox (2019–present)
On June 26, 2018, Fox announced a five-year agreement to air SmackDown, in a deal worth $205 million per year. SmackDown would debut on October 4, 2019, with its first episode being the 20th Anniversary special. The episode also marked the return of SmackDown to Friday nights and the return of WWE programming to Fox for the first time since the network aired the November 14, 1992 episode of Saturday Night's Main Event. The agreement came as WWE's previous broadcast deal with USA Network to air both SmackDown and WWE Raw was set to expire, and as Fox has increasingly emphasized live sports programming and non-scripted entertainment in the wake of its then-upcoming sale of its in-house studios to Disney. Fox had hoped to acquire Raw for the Fox network and SmackDown for FS1. However, amid a competitive bidding situation, NBCUniversal focused its efforts on renewing Raw, freeing up Fox to pursue SmackDown. In particular, Fox promised a larger amount of promotion for SmackDown during its sports programming, as well as a WWE-oriented studio show (WWE Backstage) on FS1.

Fox began an advertising campaign by Wieden+Kennedy for the move, "We're All Superstars", to coincide with the beginning of football season, revealing a new logo and the reinstatement of the Friday Night SmackDown title.

From March 13, 2020, all WWE touring shows were cancelled indefinitely due to the COVID-19 pandemic, with SmackDown, Raw, and pay-per-views being broadcast from a studio in the WWE Performance Center in Orlando, Florida with no audience beginning that night. The ensuing episode also featured Triple H as a guest commentator, and an encore presentation of the Elimination Chamber match for the SmackDown Tag Team Championship from the titular pay-per-view the previous Sunday. On August 17, WWE announced that SmackDown, Raw, and pay-per-views would move out of the Performance Center to the "WWE ThunderDome" at Orlando's Amway Center, beginning with SmackDown on August 21. The program continued to be broadcast behind closed doors, but with a virtual audience and enhanced arena production. WWE returned to hosting touring shows for SmackDown and Raw in June 2021.

Since the move to Fox, SmackDown has occasionally been pre-empted to FS1 due to conflicts with other Fox Sports programming airing in primetime, particularly the Major League Baseball postseason. In one instance in October 2019 due to the World Series, an hour-long version of the episode aired on Fox the following Sunday afternoon.

In conjunction with the 2023 Money in the Bank event, which is being held at The O2 Arena in London, England on July 1, the June 30, 2023, episode of SmackDown will be held at the same venue and will be broadcast live. This marks the first time for the show to broadcast live and in primetime from the United Kingdom at 8pm local on BT Sport.

Production 
WWE taped SmackDown on Tuesday evenings to air on Thursday evenings on UPN the same week. However, SmackDown had aired occasional live specials on Tuesday nights (which are then replayed in its usual Thursday night timeslot). The show began broadcasting in HD beginning with the January 25, 2008 episode of SmackDown, where a new set (which became universal for all WWE weekly programming) debuted. Following the first broadcast in HD, the exclamation mark used since the show's inception disappeared from all references pertaining to "SmackDown", including the official logo, which resembles the 2001–2008 logo, but with a darker blue scheme.

The early set included an oval-shaped TitanTron entrance and stage (dubbed the "Ovaltron") which made it stand out from the Raw Is War set with its rectangular Titantrons. Later productions gained the ability to move the Ovaltron either to the left or to the right of the stage. In August 2001, as part of celebrating SmackDown!s second anniversary, the show received a new logo and set, which consisted of a fist centered above the entrance with the WWF/E scratch logo above it, and many glass panes along the sides strongly resembling shattered glass with two TitanTrons on each side. From September 23, 2004 to October 3, 2008, the theme song for SmackDown! was "Rise Up" by Drowning Pool, with variations, making it the longest tenured theme song used in the program.

Whenever SmackDown shares the arena with Raw during the 2005-2007 period in a form of a supershow, the SmackDown stage utilizes all or some components of the same set from Raw.

From November 2, 2012 until April 18, 2014, SmackDown began using "Born 2 Run" by 7Lions as its theme song, with "This Life" by CFO$ and Cody B. Ware serving as the secondary theme, then a swap was made, as "Born 2 Run" was used as a secondary theme, when "This Life" is used as SmackDown's main theme. Prior to November 2, 2012, SmackDown opened with "Know Your Enemy" by Green Day while "Hangman" by Rev Theory served as the secondary theme song. Upon SmackDowns debut on Syfy in 2010, it replaced the previous theme song "Let it Roll" by Divide the Day.

As of August 3, 2012, the show has used the modified WWE HD universal set, which debuted at Raw 1000 on July 23. From September 21, 2012 until October 26, 2012, October 4, 2013 until November 1, 2013, October 3 and 31, 2014 and October 2 and 30, 2015, WWE worked in conjunction with Susan G. Komen for the Cure to raise awareness for breast cancer by adorning the SmackDown set with pink ribbons and a special pink middle-rope in the ring. SmackDowns ring ropes were usually blue from 1999 to 2012 (although they were black for a period between 2001 and 2002). They remained blue until December 2012 when they were permanently changed to white, with all WWE programming now using white ring ropes. On August 22, 2014, SmackDown switched to a full 16:9 letterbox presentation, with a down-scaled version of the native HD feed on a 4:3 SD feed. Like Raw (which also switched to a full 16:9 letterbox presentation four days earlier on August 18), the new WWE logo is seen on the ring's turnbuckle covers and also, on the lower right-hand corner of the screen. On August 29, 2014, the Syfy network logo moved to the lower left-hand corner of the screen.

Although the graphics were re-positioned, SmackDown continued to use a variation of the graphics package that had been in use since its first HD broadcast in January 2008, until the show moved to Thursday nights on January 15, 2015, when an all-new graphics package (now optimized for the 16:9 format) and intro video were introduced along with a revised SmackDown logo. On March 26, 2015, WWE added a small LED board to the left side of the ring on SmackDown, similar to Raw. On the September 14, 2015 season premiere of Raw, the middle rope was colored gold. Throughout the month of October 2015, the WWE broadcast table, entrance ramp, and ring skirts were co-branded with Susan G. Komen for the cure of breast cancer. Also, the middle ring rope was pink to promote the fight against breast cancer. Following the brand split in 2016, the ropes return to its original blue color as well as debuting a new set. The post brand extension set was almost identical to the TLC: Tables, Ladders and Chairs set from 2009 to 2013 and caused some negative feedback among online fans for re-using an old stage design. A month after the new set debut, a more distinctive and elaborate stage was created for SmackDown. The stage used was a new design with multiple LED side panels on each side with a titan-tron in a semi circle in the center. The new set also introduced LED floor panels on the entrance ramp. Feedback was more positive for this set design.

With the shift to Fox, both Raw and SmackDown introduced new sets during their "premiere week", and it was also stated that WWE would reinstate the use of pyrotechnics on both shows (after briefly suspending their use in 2017 due to budget concerns), and that both shows would now be staffed by separate writing teams. The new set featured a large TitanTron screen, with semi-arches partially resembling the original SmackDown stage.

Due to the COVID-19 pandemic, all WWE programs suspended touring shows from mid-March 2020 through mid-July 2021. All SmackDown broadcasts were filmed behind closed doors with no in-person spectators, initially from the WWE Performance Center in Orlando, before returning to an arena setting with a closed set known as the "ThunderDome"—which featured a larger-scale production more in line with its touring shows, but with a virtual audience displayed on a grandstand constructed from video boards.

With the return to live shows in July 2021, a new universal stage was adopted by both SmackDown and Raw, with a high-resolution LED screen, and increasing use of augmented reality graphics for the television production.

Theme music 

 Notes	
	
  Bold song titles are currently being used as the opening theme.
  The first version was an instrumental composed by Jim Johnston and it was only used on September 23, 2004 for SmackDown's 5th Anniversary. Another version was performed by Ryan McCombs entitled "Rise Up 2006" and was used from March 24, 2006.

Cultural references 
On July 10, 2007, Merriam-Webster included the word smackdown in Webster's Dictionary. Merriam Webster defined a "smackdown" as:
 The act of knocking down or bringing down an opponent.
 A contest in entertainment wrestling.
 A decisive defeat.
 A confrontation between rivals or competitors.

The Oxford English Dictionary traces the use of the word smackdown in English back at least as far as 1990, but notes that a professional wrestling television show "popularized" the term.

Special episodes 

Throughout its broadcast history, the show has aired editions that have different themes. These include tributes to various professional wrestlers who have recently died or retired from actively performing, and episodes commemorating various show milestones or anniversaries.

Episodes

On-air personalities 

Various on-air personalities appear on the show, including the wrestlers (both men and women), ring announcers, commentators, and on-screen authority figures. SmackDown also has had various recurring on-air segments hosted by members of the roster.

Other SmackDown-branded properties 
Although SmackDown has been the second-largest show in the WWE, the company's use of the term went beyond its namesake program. During the 2000 U.S. election campaign, the WWE launched the SmackDown! Your Vote program.

The name was also used when WWE released its 2015 film The Flintstones & WWE: Stone Age SmackDown! and WWE Network's show Kitchen SmackDown!.

Broadcast 
In addition to the Spanish-language Fox Deportes simulcasting with Fox live in the United States and broadcasts to American troops deployed overseas on AFN Sports 2, SmackDown also appears on-air internationally.

Americas

Latin America
SmackDown airs live on Fox Sports in Mexico and across Central and South America since 2014.

In Mexico, MVS aired SmackDown between 2005 and 2008, and Azteca 7 from 2008 to 2014.

Canada
In Canada, SmackDown has historically been aired by Sportsnet 360 (SN360, formerly known as The Score), as part of network owner Rogers Media's long-term deal with WWE. The program has historically aired sometimes in simulcast with the U.S. airing and sometimes a day before. In 2005, when the taped show moved to Friday airings in the U.S., it remained on Thursdays in Canada for a period of time. During its return to Thursdays in the U.S. from January 2015 to July 2016, pre-recorded episodes of SmackDown aired on Wednesdays—one night earlier—due to conflicts with the channel's Thursday-night National Hockey League broadcasts.

The program has aired in simulcast with the U.S. broadcast since it switched to a live format in July 2016, initially on Tuesdays and then moving back to Fridays in October 2019.
Despite the move to Fox (which is widely carried on Canadian television providers), Rogers has not elected to simulcast SmackDown on its broadcast network Citytv to invoke potential simsub rights.

As Rogers holds the rights to the National Hockey League broadcasts, the program also airs on its OLN channel.

Jamaica 
In Jamaica, SmackDown airs live on Fridays on Flow 1, with a replay on Sundays.

Asia, Africa and Oceania 
SmackDown airs live in the MENA region on Shahid Saturday mornings, and later on the same day, a one-hour version airs on MBC Action at 8PM Egypt Standard Time.

SmackDown airs live in Australia on Saturday late mornings/early afternoons and Sunday afternoons on Fox8 and Friday nights on 9Go! as a one-hour version, and airs live in New Zealand on Sky 5 and Sunday nights on Prime as a one-hour version.

SmackDown airs in China on various television networks.

SmackDown airs in Fiji on Sky Pacific and Sky Fiji.

SmackDown airs live in Pakistan and in Bangladesh, Nepal, Sri Lanka and India on Sony Ten and Kenya on Kenya Broadcasting Corporation.

SmackDown airs in Malaysia on Astro Supersport 4,

The series airs in the Philippines on One Sports via Cignal TV.

SmackDown airs live in Indonesia on Mola TV. Previously broadcast by RCTI year 2000 until 2003 every Friday Night

The series airs live in Singapore on Starhub's HubSports 2,
South Africa on SuperSport, and Samoa on SBC.

SmackDown airs in Israel on 5LIVE. It also airs on FM1 (Previously Iran FM-TV) in Iran.

In South Africa, SmackDown was previously broadcast by free-to-air broadcaster e.tv. The show would play on Wednesday nights in the evening, with a 7-day delay, edited to one hour and was one of the most watched programs on the channel. However, in 2017 e.tv decided not to renew its broadcasting deal with WWE. The rights were later resold to SuperSport (the initial broadcasters of WWE programming) who broadcast the show across Sub-Saharan Africa, live and uncut.

In 2019 SuperSport, along with its parent company Multichoice, signed a deal to broadcast the 24-hour WWE channel on their DStv platform. The program airs at 02:00 live, while it is also broadcast on prime time at 09:00, 14:00 & 20:00..

Europe 
In France, SmackDown airs on AB1 every Saturday at 9pm.  In Germany, Austria and Switzerland SmackDown airs live on DAZN with English Commentary and on ProSieben MAXX every Saturday at 10pm with an two-hour Version in German.

In Hungary, SmackDown airs on Galaxy4 every Wednesday at 10:15pm.

In Italy, SmackDown airs on DMAX, with international version of one-hour shows airing on Cielo in Italian. In Poland, SmackDown airs on Extreme Sports Channel airs three days late.

In Portugal, SmackDown airs live on SportTV 4 every Saturday at 1am. In Russia, SmackDown airs on Матч! Боец with Russian commentary.

In Spain, SmackDown airs on Mega every Sunday at 1pm. In the United Kingdom and Ireland, Smackdown airs live on BT Sport, with a one hour version airing on 5Action every Friday at 11pm. Virgin Media Two also airs a one hour version in Ireland every Sunday Morning.

In Malta, SmackDown airs on Melita Sports 1.

Online streaming 
On May 22, 2009, Hulu and WWE agreed to air full episodes of SmackDown to be available for viewing the day following its original airing. On September 24, 2012, Hulu signed a multi-year deal with WWE to stream all of the company's TV shows and some of its web series, which includes SmackDown. Full episodes of SmackDown are available for viewing the following day of its original airing. All previous episodes of SmackDown are available on the WWE Network, where recent episodes are available for on-demand viewing 30 days after the original air date.

Broadcast history

See also 
 List of WWE personnel

References

External links 

 
 WWE SmackDown at USANetwork.com
 
 

 
1999 American television series debuts
2000s American television series
2010s American television series
2020s American television series
The CW original programming
English-language television shows
Fox Broadcasting Company original programming
MyNetworkTV original programming
Syfy original programming
USA Network original programming
UPN original programming
American live television series
Wrestling Observer Newsletter award winners

he:WWE#סמאקדאון